Yazıcı Dam, also known as Ağrı Yazıcı Dam, is a dam in Ağrı Province, Eastern Anatolia, Turkey. The construction works began in 1995 and the dam went in service in 2009. The development was backed by the Turkish State Hydraulic Works.

See also
List of dams and reservoirs in Turkey

References

Dams in Ağrı Province
Dams completed in 2009